Jerzy Michał Wołodyjowski is a fictional Polish hero in Henryk Sienkiewicz's Trilogy: With Fire and Sword, The Deluge and Pan Wołodyjowski.

Michał Wołodyjowski is partly based on the historic figure, Colonel , a Polish noble of the Korczak clan.

The trilogy sees Michał Wołodyjowski take part in many battles from a young age, distinguishing him as a feared warrior of great renown. The novels make special mention of his reputation as one of the finest swordsmen alive, a true master of the szabla (a type of Polish saber), as well as a master tactician. His character arc revolves around a war which saw Poland confronted with four super-powers. In one notable battle the Polish army, outnumbered by seven thousand Turkish soldiers, is victorious when the enemy retreats from the field of battle after learning that it is led by Michał Wołodyjowski. The novels take place during the second half of the 17th century and focus around Wołodyjowski, nicknamed the "Little Knight" on account of his small physical stature, journeying with his friends Jan Skrzetuski and Onufry Zagłoba, fighting to save his country from foreign invaders.

Wołodyjowski dies in the Siege of Kamieniec Podolski when together with his friend Ketling he sacrifices himself by detonating a gunpowder depot, rather than witness the surrender of the fortress caused by the surrender of the city.

The novels have also been made into films: With Fire and Sword, The Deluge and Pan Wolodyjowski.

References 

Characters in novels of the 19th century
Literary characters introduced in 1884
Sienkiewicz's Trilogy
Fictional people from the 17th-century